Dumas Guette (born 25 December 1952) is a Colombian former footballer who competed in the 1972 Summer Olympics.

References

1952 births
Living people
Association football defenders
Colombian footballers
Olympic footballers of Colombia
Footballers at the 1972 Summer Olympics
Deportivo Cali footballers
20th-century Colombian people